Pelophylax hubeiensis is a species of frog in the family Ranidae. It is endemic to China.

Its natural habitats are freshwater marshes, ponds, irrigated land, and seasonally flooded agricultural land. It is not considered threatened by the IUCN.

References

Amphibians of China
Pelophylax
Amphibians described in 1982
Taxonomy articles created by Polbot